Oakland Heritage Alliance (OHA) is an American non-profit organization based in Oakland, California. OHA advocates the protection, preservation, and revitalization of Oakland's architectural, historic, cultural and natural resources through publications, education, and direct action.

OHA began in 1980 with a bankroll of $150 and seven individuals who loved the city's history. Founding members came from a core of those involved in the Oakland Cultural Heritage Survey which was funded by a 1979 state grant.

OHA activities:

Partners in Preservation awards are given to encourage organizations and individuals to restore and revitalize Oakland's historic homes, buildings, structures, and neighborhoods and to support sensitive adaptive use.
Walking tours concentrate on a single neighborhood at a time and are open to both OHA members and the public on a sliding scale fee. Most walking tours take place on Saturdays and Sundays in the summer. 
Open house tours are similar to walking tours but offer the chance to see inside a handful of private homes each of which exemplify a particular architectural style common to the tour's focus. 
Participation at the city government level to promote preservation.
Oakland Heritage Alliance publishes a quarterly newsletter: OHA News.

Membership is open to any interested party.

External links
Oakland Heritage Alliance

Historic preservation organizations in the United States
Heritage organizations
History of Oakland, California
Organizations based in Oakland, California
Non-profit organizations based in the San Francisco Bay Area
Architecture in the San Francisco Bay Area